John James Hope-Johnstone of Annandale (1796 – 11 July 1876) was a Scottish Tory politician.

The eldest son of Vice-Admiral Sir William Johnstone Hope GCB and Lady Anne, eldest daughter of the 3rd Earl of Hopetoun.

In 1816 he married Alicia-Anne, eldest daughter of George Gordon esq. He was Keeper of Lochmaben Palace.

He was the Member of Parliament (MP) for Dumfriesshire from 1830 until 1847 and again from 1857 to 1865.

He lived at Raehills, Lockerbie, and Hook House, Dumfriesshire.

He was de jure 7th Earl of Annandale and Hartfell.

Sources 
Oliver & Boyd's New Edinburgh Almanac and National Repository, 1845

References

External links 
 

1796 births
1876 deaths
John
Tory MPs (pre-1834)
Scottish Tory MPs (pre-1912)
UK MPs 1830–1831
UK MPs 1831–1832
UK MPs 1832–1835
UK MPs 1835–1837
UK MPs 1837–1841
UK MPs 1841–1847
UK MPs 1852–1857 
UK MPs 1857–1859
UK MPs 1859–1865
19th-century Scottish people
Earls of Annandale and Hartfell